Matthew Littleton Winters (born March 18, 1960) is a former professional baseball player from Buffalo, New York. He played part of one season in Major League Baseball with the Kansas City Royals, and four seasons with the Nippon Ham Fighters in Nippon Professional Baseball.

Career
Winters was drafted by the New York Yankees in the first round of the 1978 amateur draft, and spent most of his career in the minor leagues. He was released by the Yankees in 1985, and signed with the Chicago White Sox, before being returned to the Yankees in a trade for cash and several minor league players. He signed with the Kansas City Royals in 1987, and made his major league debut in 1989 with the Royals. He played in 42 games in 1989 before being released at the end of the season.

He signed with the Fighters in the Japanese Pacific League in 1990 and quickly emerged as the team's best power hitter, hitting over 30 home runs each of his first four seasons in Japan. He recorded the second most home runs in the league for three consecutive years, behind Orestes Destrade. He also attracted attention from fans for his avid personality; he frequently participated in between-inning dance performances, and performed magic tricks whenever a game was stopped due to rain. His antics and clutch hitting made him one of the most popular players in the league. He dropped to 22 home runs in 1994, and announced his retirement during the off-season.

He worked as a scout and coach in the minor leagues before becoming a scout for the Fighters.

External links

1960 births
Living people
Albany-Colonie Yankees players
American expatriate baseball players in Japan
Baseball players from Buffalo, New York
Buffalo Bisons (minor league) players
Columbus Clippers players
Fort Lauderdale Yankees players
Greensboro Hornets players
Kansas City Royals players
Major League Baseball outfielders
Memphis Chicks players
Nashville Sounds players
Nippon Ham Fighters players
Nippon Professional Baseball designated hitters
Omaha Royals players
Oneonta Yankees players